Irymple is a suburb of Mildura in the state of Victoria in Australia. Located in the region of Sunraysia in the far North-West Victoria, Irymple is 6 km south of Mildura and 550 km northwest of Melbourne.  At the 2016 census, Irymple and the surrounding area had a population of 5,325.

The township was established soon after Mildura, the Post Office opening on 17 February 1892.

Features
The township has one kindergarten (Irymple Kindergarten), two primary schools (Irymple Primary School and Irymple South Primary School), one secondary school (Irymple Secondary College, years 7–10) and two P-10 schools (the Baptist Mildura Christian College and the Adventist Henderson College).

Irymple has a football and netball club competing in the Sunraysia Football Netball League, a soccer club, a lawn bowls club, a bocce club, a swimming club and a basketball association, all of which have home grounds located in the township. During 2017, Irymple Football and Netball Club won 4 of the 6 possible grand finals in the Sunraysia Football Netball League.

References

Towns in Victoria (Australia)
Mallee (Victoria)